Albert Tracy Leffingwell, M.D. (February 13, 1845 – September 1, 1916) was an American physician, social reformer, and vocal advocate for vivisection reform. He authored many books bringing light to the cruel abuses of animal experimentation and calling for regulation. At the same time, he sought middle ground between the anti-vivisection societies, which called for the abolition of all experimentation and those who rejected any restraints. Leffingwell also was concerned with meat safety, believing that lax regulations, in particular allowing cancerous animals into the food chain, were responsible for increases in the incidence of cancer. He also served as the president of the American Humane Association.

Selected publications

Rambles Through Japan Without a Guide. London, 1892.
Illegitimacy and the Influence of Seasons upon Conduct. London and New York, 1893.
A Dangerous Ideal, 1894.
 Vivisection in America. New York, 1895.
 Does Science Need Secrecy?. Providence, 1896.
 Physiology in our Public Schools. Boston, 1900. 
The Vivisection Question. New York, 1901.
Illustration of Human Vivisection, 1907 (pamphlet).
The Morality of London. London, 1908.
The Vivisection Controversy. London, 1908.
American Meat. London and New York, 1910.
An Ethical Problem. London and New York, 1916

References

External links

 
 
 Albert Leffingwell Collection
 Albert Leffingwell Home Recordings: An inventory of his recordings at Syracuse University

1845 births
1916 deaths
19th-century American physicians
American social reformers
Animal welfare workers